Michelle Kosinski is an American journalist, host, and public speaker.  She most recently wrote and hosted the podcast The Perfect Scam. Previously she was a Senior Diplomatic Correspondent for CNN and White House Correspondent for CNN until 2019.
She was a foreign correspondent for NBC News based in London (2010–2014); before that she was a correspondent based in Miami (2005–2009).

She has covered numerous international news stories including the US war in Afghanistan, the Arab Spring, the assassination of Benazir Bhutto, the Haiti earthquake, the BP oil spill, the Virginia Tech shootings, the Obama White House, the tenure and firing of Rex Tillerson, et al. She is currently one of the main anchors for international news channel TRT World News based in Istanbul.

Career
Kosinski began work in broadcast journalism in Rockford, Illinois for WIFR while earning her BA and MA from the Medill School of Journalism at Northwestern University. Leaving WIFR, she moved to Charlotte, North Carolina at WSOC-TV and founded the Piedmont Bureau. In 2001, she was voted the Best Reporter in Charlotte by readers of the city's arts and entertainment magazine. In Fall of 2001, she left WSOC-TV for WTVJ in Miami. She is a 2003 Suncoast Regional Emmy Awards Craft Winner for reporting on Haitian immigrants and was named Woman of the Year in 2005 by Women in Communications of South Florida.

Kosinski has covered such world events as the War in Afghanistan, terrorist plots in Europe, international court cases, and the 2010 Haiti earthquake.

In 2005, Kosinski was involved in video news scene while covering flooding in New Jersey. In the video she was seen paddling in a canoe, in what she claimed were in deep floodwaters, when two pedestrians walked through the shot exposing the water to only be a few inches deep; Kosinski declared at the time "O.K., this probably looks a little bad". News reports from the time showed chest-deep water and people using boats. Kosinski explained to The New York Observer that while the shot was originally in the deep water, the crew insisted on moving the boat to the edge of the water, so that they could light and mic it properly. The crew was also concerned for safety, as the water was moving quickly. This was visible in the taped piece that ran with the live element.

In 2009, she won a national Emmy award for live reporting during NBC News' special coverage of the 2008 U.S. presidential election.

In 2010, Kosinski was named a foreign correspondent and moved from NBC's Southeast Bureau to London.

In 2014, she became a White House correspondent for CNN.

NBC News
In 2005, Kosinski worked as a foreign correspondent for NBC News based in London.  She covered numerous  international events such as the 2010 Haiti earthquake, the aftermath of the Arab Spring, the assassination of Benazir Bhutto, terrorist plots and bombings in Europe, US-Russia relations, and Virginia Tech shooting.

Other 
In August 2005, while covering the Natalee Holloway disappearance in Aruba, NBC arranged an interview with the director of Aruban prisons and a tour of suspect Joran van der Sloot's prison. During the tour, she ran into van der Sloot and conducted an off-camera interview. Prison director Fred Maduro appeared live on MSNBC and admitted that he offered her the tour. After Van der Sloot's attorneys called for a hearing on the matter, NBC declined to air the footage.

In 2009, Kosinski purchased a $5.6 million,  home in Coral Gables, Florida.

Education 
Kosinski attended St. Charles Borromeo School and graduated from Holy Cross High School as valedictorian. She earned bachelor's and master's degrees from the Medill School of Journalism at Northwestern University. Originally in the magazine writing program, she later switched to the broadcasting division.

Personal life 
Kosinski was born in Willingboro Township, New Jersey, and grew up in nearby Cinnaminson Township, New Jersey. She is one of four children of Jeanette, a chemist, and Robert, a retired biologist who worked for the New Jersey Department of Environmental Protection. While working as a television news photographer and reporter in Charlotte, North Carolina, she also performed with the award-winning Piedmont Players theater group,  in roles such as Elvira in Blithe Spirit and Suzanne in Don't Dress for Dinner.  she began living in London.

In August 2013, Kosinski announced her engagement to retired investment banker and philanthropist Kimbell Duncan. They married on August 9, 2014.  The Times reported allegations about a 2018 "passionate affair [lasting] at least several months" with an ambassador, that "resulted in impressive scoops for Kosinski."  Kosinski denied the scoops originated with the ambassador, and hired Prince William's lawyer to combat reports of the affair.

Community 
For several years, Kosinski has served on the executive host committee for Amigos For Kids, a charitable organization based in Miami. Kosinski has volunteered for and supported numerous community organizations. She has sought out and highlighted innovative charitable work around the United States, as a regular contributor to Nightly News' "Making a Difference" series, which has in turn positively impacted those efforts.

References

External links 
 Official CNN bio

Living people
American expatriates in the United Kingdom
American television journalists
NBC News people
CNN people
Holy Cross Academy (New Jersey) alumni
Medill School of Journalism alumni
People from Cinnaminson Township, New Jersey
People from Willingboro Township, New Jersey
American women television journalists
Year of birth missing (living people)
21st-century American women